John Potter is a race car driver and race team owner.

Business career
He is also the founder of Magnus Racing.

Racing career
He is a class winner at the 2012 24 Hours of Daytona, the 2014 12 Hours of Sebring, and the 2016 24 Hours of Daytona.

IMSA WeatherTech SportsCar Championship results 
(key)

† Points only counted towards the WeatherTech Sprint Cup and not the overall GTD Championship.
* Season still in progress
Notes
1 Disqualified for minimum ride height violation.

References

1982 births
Living people
24 Hours of Daytona drivers
American Le Mans Series drivers
Rolex Sports Car Series drivers
WeatherTech SportsCar Championship drivers
Michelin Pilot Challenge drivers